Shafqat Rana (Punjabi, born August 10, 1943) is a former Pakistani cricketer who played in five Tests from 1964 to 1969.

Shafqat Rana was a right-handed batsman, strong on the drive and cut, who played five Tests in six years. He made his highest Test score of 95 in the Second Test against New Zealand in 1969, which was also Pakistan's highest score in the three-Test series. He also made 65 in the Third Test.

He made his first-class debut in 1959-60, and toured England with the Pakistan Eaglets in 1963. He toured Australia and New Zealand with the Pakistan team in 1964-65, scoring 182 runs at 18.20 and not playing in any of the Tests. He later toured England in 1971, scoring 228 runs at 17.53, also without playing a Test.

He played his last first-class match in 1978-79. His highest score was 174 for Lahore against Sargodha in the Quaid-e-Azam Trophy in 1968-69 at Lahore, when he put on 330 for the fourth wicket with Waqar Ahmed.

References

External links
 
 Shafqat Rana at Cricket Archive

1943 births
Living people
People from Shimla
Pakistan Test cricketers
Pakistani cricketers
Lahore cricketers
Lahore A cricketers
Pakistan International Airlines A cricketers
Pakistan International Airlines B cricketers
Pakistan International Airlines cricketers
Pakistan Eaglets cricketers
Lahore Greens cricketers
Punjabi people